Deep Freeze may refer to:

Entertainment
 Deep Freeze (film), a 2003 horror film
 Deep Freeze (video game), a 1999 PlayStation video game
 "Deep Freeze" (song), a song by Rina Aiuchi
 "Deep Freeze", a song from the album Urban Hymns by The Verve
 "Deep Freeze" (Batman: The Animated Series), a 1994 television show episode
 "Deep Freeze", an episode of CSI: Miami
 "The Deep Freeze", an episode of the animated television series Xiaolin Showdown

Other uses
 Deep Freeze (software), a protective program
 Deep or Big Freeze, a purported cooling effect of the expanding universe
 Deep Freeze Range, a mountain range in Antarctica
 Deep freezer, a stand-alone freezer unit for preserving food
 Operation Deep Freeze, a series of American expeditions to Antarctica beginning in 1955

See also
 John Friesz (born 1967), American former National Football League quarterback nicknamed "Deep"